The 1955 Stanford Indians football team represented Stanford University in the Pacific Coast Conference during the 1955 college football season. Led by fifth-year head coach Chuck Taylor, the Indians finished at 6–3–1 overall (3–2–1 in PCC, third), and played home games on campus at Stanford Stadium in Stanford, California.

Schedule

NFL Draft
Two Stanford Indians were selected in the 1956 NFL Draft

 Wiggin was a "future pick" and returned to play for Stanford as a senior in 1956.

References

Stanford
Stanford Cardinal football seasons
Stanford Indians football